is a Japanese science fiction manga series by Keiko Takemiya. It was originally serialized in Asahi Sonorama's Gekkan Manga Shōnen magazine, between January 1977 and May 1980. In 1978, it won the first Seiun Award for manga, and in 1980 also won the Shogakukan Manga Award for shōnen/shōjo manga (along with Takemiya's Kaze to Ki no Uta).

In 1980, it was adapted into an anime movie, produced by Toei Animation and directed by Hideo Onchi. In 2007, the manga was adapted into an anime television series, co-animated by Minamimachi Bugyōsho and Tokyo Kids, and produced by Aniplex, SKY Perfect Well Think, and Mainichi Broadcasting System. Directed by Osamu Yamazaki and featuring character designs by Nobuteru Yuki, it premiered in Japan on MBS-TBS's Saturday 6:00pm doroku time slot (previously occupied by other notable anime series such as Mobile Suit Gundam SEED, Fullmetal Alchemist and Blood+) on April 7, 2007, and ended on September 22, 2007, replacing the cancelled Bones series Tenpō Ibun Ayakashi Ayashi.

Plot

The story takes place in the distant future sometime after the 31st millennium where humanity exists under the rule of the political order controlled by supercomputers known as Superior Dominance and the carefully selected humans known as the Members Elite. Centuries before the story begins, the human race came to the conclusion that war and pollution rendered life on Earth unsustainable. Using warp travel the decision was made to leave a supercomputer artificial general intelligence and caretaker humans behind and colonize distant stars.

Under the rule of Superior Dominance all humans are born in vitro and given to carefully selected parents. At the age of 14, all children are put through brainwashing where their memories are wiped by Superior Dominance and overwritten to produce functional adults. A race of advanced humans with psionic abilities called Mu (pronounced myuu, μ) has evolved, and the supercomputers that control Superior Dominance make every effort to exterminate them. Led by Soldier Blue and then Soldier Shin, the Mu make every effort to locate and rescue as many Mu children as possible before the children are discovered and eliminated. The Mu have only one wish, to return to what they see as their promised land, Terra.

The series spans a large number of years, jumping back and forth multiple times, from Soldier Shin's life on Ataraxia, the various events on Station E-1077, Soldier Shin's founding of a Mu colony on a habitable planet, Neska, the Superior Dominance war of extermination on the Mu, and finally to the Mu's return to Terra.

Media

Manga
The manga series, written and illustrated by Keiko Takemiya, was serialized by Asahi Sonorama in Gekkan Manga Shōnen between January 1977 and May 1980. The chapters were collected in five bound volumes, which was reissued in August 1980 with the release of the movie. In 2007, on the day before the TV series began airing, the manga was reprinted by Japanese publisher Square Enix. In 2007, American publisher Vertical released the manga in three print volumes in North America under the title To Terra.... Manga Planet re-released the series digitally in 2019 under the title “Toward the Terra.” The series won two awards: the Seiun Award for best manga in 1978 and the Shogakukan Manga Award for best shōnen in 1979.

Movie
In 1980, Toward the Terra was adapted into an animated movie, produced by Toei Animation and directed by Hideo Onchi. Rightstuf released a hardsubbed version of the movie in North America. It was titled Toward the Terra, and appeared on VHS in 1994 and on laserdisc in 1995. At Anime Expo 2008, The Right Stuf International announced that its Nozomi Entertainment division had licensed the Toward the Terra film for the North American market.

TV series
Toward the Terra was adapted into an animated TV series in 2007, co-animated by Minamimachi Bugyōsho and Tokyo Kids, and produced by Aniplex, SKY Perfect Well Think and Mainichi Broadcasting System. It was directed by Osamu Yamazaki, written by Satoru Nishizono and featured character and conceptual designs by Nobuteru Yuki (Vision of Escaflowne) and Yutaka Izubuchi (RahXephon) respectively. The first opening theme, spanning episodes 1-13, was "Endscape", performed by the band UVERworld, while the first ending theme is "Love is", performed by Miliyah Kato. These were replaced from episodes 14-24 onwards, with the second opening theme being "Jet Boy Jet Girl", performed by Hitomi Takahashi, and the second ending theme being "This Night", performed by Chemistry.

The series premiered in Japan on MBS-TBS's Saturday 6:00pm time slot on April 7, 2007. That time slot was previously occupied by other notable animated series, such as Mobile Suit Gundam Seed and Fullmetal Alchemist. It was replaced in this timeslot by Mobile Suit Gundam 00, which premiered in October 2007. The series was also aired in Japan on the BS network Animax, who also subsequently aired in its English language network in Southeast Asia and South Asia.

Episodes

Reception
The 2007 anime adaptation received mostly positive reviews from critics. Theron Martin of the Anime News Network gave the series several positive reviews concluding, "Toward the Terra is not a top-rate series, but it tells a good enough and engrossing enough, and acceptable enough, story to be worth a look. It never much more than toys with the serious underlying issues it touches upon, and has definite flaws elsewhere, but through this span of episodes it is still less shallow than most typical series."

See also

 Slan, a 1946 novel with a similar premise and protagonist with the same first name

References

External links
 Official website of anime television series 
 Right Stuf/Nozomi's Official film website via Internet Archive
 
 
 Movie review at scifi.com via Internet Archive

1977 manga
1980 anime films
2007 manga
Animated films based on manga
Aniplex
Asahi Sonorama manga
Bandai Entertainment anime titles
Gangan Comics manga
Japanese-language films
Keiko Takemiya
Mainichi Broadcasting System original programming
Manga adapted into films
Shōnen manga
Space opera anime and manga
Toei Animation films
Toei Company films
Vertical (publisher) titles
Winners of the Shogakukan Manga Award for shōnen manga
Fiction about psychic powers